Blue, originally titled The Blue Album, is a studio album by American singer Diana Ross. Initially recorded between late 1971 and early 1972, it was released as Ross' twenty-third studio album by Motown Records on June 20, 2006. Overseen by Ross' musical director Gil Askey, the jazz-flavoured album was originally conceived as a follow-up to her soundtrack to the 1972 American biographical drama film Lady Sings the Blues in which Ross starred. Berry Gordy and Motown subsequently decided to shelve the album, and Ross' next release was the more pop-oriented Touch Me in the Morning (1973) album.

Critical reception

Allmusic editor Rob Theakston found that "Gil Askey's arrangements are top-notch without sounding like dinner theater knock-offs. Blue is an album every bit as bold an artistic statement as her contemporaries Stevie Wonder and Marvin Gaye, who were recording the opuses Where I'm Coming From and What's Going On around the same time, and for Ross fans, Blue is every bit as enjoyable as her sultriest moments as the supreme Supreme."

Chart performance
Blue was initially sold through Starbucks' US stores for the first 30 days of release, though coffeehouse chain immediately sold out of its  supply nationwide. On the charts, Blue peaked at number two on the US Billboard Top Jazz Albums, also logging a single week on the Billboard 200 at number 146. Its final sales figure was slightly higher than 100,000 US copies.

Track listing
All songs produced and conducted by Gil Askey.

Notes
Tracks 12-15 were originally recorded for Lady Sings the Blues (1972) but some were left out of the movie or were included in different versions.

Personnel

 Gil Askey – Conductor, Musical Arrangements, Producer
 Oliver Nelson, Benny Golson - Arrangements
 Guy Costa – Engineer
 Cal Harris, Sr. – Engineer
 Michele Horie – Producer, Artwork
 Harry Langdon – Photography, Cover Photo
 Pat Lawrence – Executive Producer
 Ralph Lotten – Assistant
 Bill MacMeeken – Engineer
 Larry Miles – Engineer
 John B. Norman – Engineer
 Ryan Null – Photo Coordination
 Kevin Reeves – Mastering, Mixing
 David Ritz – Liner Notes
 Greg Ross – Design
 George Solomon – Consultant
 Art Stewart – Engineer
 Russ Terrana – Engineer
 Harry Weinger – Liner Notes, Compilation Producer

Charts

References

External links 
 Blue at Motown.com

Motown albums
2006 albums
Diana Ross albums
Albums produced by Gil Askey